East Whitburn is a small village in Scottish county of West Lothian. Bordering the mining town of Whitburn,East Whitburn has grown significantly in the past few years due to developments of large houses. It has one local store and a hairdressers on the main road passing through the village.

References

External links

Canmore - East Whitburn Country House site record

Villages in West Lothian